KFXN (690 AM; "Hmong Radio AM 690") is a radio station licensed to Minneapolis, Minnesota, serving the Twin Cities area. The station is owned by Kongsue Xiong, through licensee Asian American Broadcasting, LLC.

On July 21, 2010, former owner Clear Channel Communications announced it would donate the station through the Minority Media and Telecommunications Council (MMTC)-Clear Channel Ownership Diversity Initiative. In September 2011, the station switched to an ethnic-based format catering to the local Hmong-American community.

KFXN is essentially a daytime-only station, broadcasting at 1700 watts, though it does have a five watt signal during nighttime hours with very limited reach. This is to protect CKGM in Montreal, Quebec, Canada. The transmitter and single tower antenna is located in New Hope on Winnetka Avenue north of 36th Avenue. This has been the only transmitter location for the station since it signed on the air on April 5, 1962. In August 2009, KTTB (96.3 FM) relocated its transmission facilities from Watertown to the KFXN site. Originally the station had used a 3 tower antenna array to shape the then 500 watt signal to protect the Canadian clear channel station as well as a now defunct KUSD station located in Vermillion South Dakota. In 2020 the center tower of the KFXN array collapsed, severing the transmission lines feeding the other 2 towers. The station operated with a Special Temporary Authorization from the FCC to operate non directional from the east tower at a reduced power of 120 watts.Engineering studies were conducted and the station was able to increase power and go to a non directional single tower pattern while protecting the signal of CKGM, the predominant Canadian Clear Channel. <https://transition.fcc.gov/fcc-bin/amq?list=0&facid=10141>

History
The station signed on in 1962 with the KTCR call sign, and a country music format. In 1968, new owner Al Tedesco purchased a companion FM station, KWFM, renaming it KTCR-FM.

In 1983, both stations were sold to John and Kathleen Parker, who gave the stations a makeover. The FM was changed to an adult album alternative/new-age music format as KTCZ-FM, and KTCR became jazz as KTCJ to complement 'Cities 97'. The AM's jazz format lasted several years and the station was among the early market adopters of AM stereo, but eventually ceded to a simulcast with KTCZ-FM. On April 17, 1997, KTCJ, the sole remaining AM simulcasting an FM in the market, switched to classic country music. The call letters were changed to KXBR ("The Bear") that December.

In December 1998, KXBR dropped country and became KFXN, a counterpart to sports-formatted sister KFAN 1130. The station was branded as "Score 690" airing a complementary sports talk format, which consisted mostly of syndicated shows from Fox Sports Radio and Sporting News Radio, as well as Jim Rome's nationally syndicated program, and repeats of KFAN's local shows. With its 2011 divestiture of KFXN and resulting format change by the new owner, Clear Channel moved the sports format of "The Score" to the HD2 subchannel of KTCZ-FM.

The station was sold by MMTC to Asian American Broadcasting, LLC in a transaction that was consummated on May 5, 2014. The purchase price for the station was $255,000.

References

External links
FCC History Cards for KFXN
KFXN transmitter tour courtesy of Aaron White

1973 airchecks
Broadcasting Yearbook 1963
https://transition.fcc.gov/fcc-bin/amq?list=0&facid=10141

Asian-American culture in Minneapolis–Saint Paul
Hmong-American culture in Minneapolis–Saint Paul
Radio stations in Minneapolis–Saint Paul
Radio stations established in 1962